Paul Resnick is Michael D. Cohen Collegiate Professor of Information and Associate Dean for Research and Faculty Affairs at the School of Information at the University of Michigan.

Education

Paul Resnick was born in Michigan and attended the University of Michigan for his undergraduate studies. He received a Ph.D. at the Massachusetts Institute of Technology (MIT) in 1992 in Computer Science. After graduating from MIT, Resnick worked at AT&T Labs and AT&T Bell Labs and was an assistant Professor at the MIT Sloan School of Management. Resnick became an assistant professor at the University of Michigan in 1997, and subsequently became Associate Professor, Professor, and then Associate Dean.

Awards
Resnick was elected to the CHI Academy in 2017. He received the 2010 ACM Software Systems Award for his work on the GroupLens Collaborative Filtering Recommender System which showed how distributed users could personalize recommendations via ratings. He also received the ACM Special Interest Group on E-commerce Test of Time Award for the paper titled "The Social Cost of Cheap Pseudonyms". He received the 2016 University of Michigan Distinguished Faculty Achievement Award. In 2020, he was selected as Fellow of the Association for Computing Machinery (ACM) for contributions to recommender systems, economics and computation, and online communities.

Selected works
 2013. Building Successful Online Communities: Evidence-Based Social Design (with Bob Kraut)
 1994. GroupLens: an open architecture for collaborative filtering of netnews
 1997. Recommender systems (with Hal Varian)
 2001. The social cost of cheap pseudonyms

References

External links

Human–computer interaction researchers
Living people
MIT School of Engineering alumni
Social computing researchers
University of Michigan alumni
University of Michigan faculty
Year of birth missing (living people)
Date of birth missing (living people)
Academics from Michigan
People from Ann Arbor, Michigan
Fellows of the Association for Computing Machinery